Robin Neupert (born 19 August 1991) is a German footballer who currently plays for Neckarsulmer SU.

Career

Neupert began his career with 1899 Hoffenheim, and spent three years playing for the reserve team before joining 3. Liga side Preußen Münster in 2012. He made his debut for the club in the second match of the 2012–13 season, replacing Philip Heise in a 1–0 win over Chemnitzer FC.

References

External links

1991 births
Living people
German footballers
Germany youth international footballers
TSG 1899 Hoffenheim II players
SC Preußen Münster players
SV Waldhof Mannheim players
3. Liga players
Association football central defenders
Sportspeople from Heilbronn
Footballers from Baden-Württemberg